Thomsenolite is a mineral with formula: NaCaAlF6·H2O. It is an alteration product of cryolite.

It was discovered in 1868 in Ivigtut, Greenland and named for Hans Peter Jorgen Julius Thomsen (1826–1909).

References

Sodium minerals
Calcium minerals
Aluminium minerals
Fluorine minerals
Monoclinic minerals
Minerals in space group 14